Angels and Daemons at Play is the sixth full-length studio album by the Norwegian rock-band Motorpsycho.

The album was originally released as three EP's; "Babyscooter" (released January 27), "Have Spacesuit Will Travel" (February 3) and "Lovelight" (February 10). Only 500 copies were pressed of each.

It was later also released as a single CD and on double LP, the latter featuring the two bonus tracks "Have Spacesuit, Will Travel" (from the EP of the same name), and "Back to Source" (to be released on the Ozone EP the following year).

The cover art was made by Kim Hiorthøy.

Track listings

Single CD version

Double LP version

Side 1

Side 2

Side 3

Side 4

The original EPs
Babyscooter
 "Sideway Spiral" – 2:33
 "Walking on the Water" – 4:19
 "Heartattack Mac" – 7:41
 "Pills Powders + Passion Plays" – 3:24
 "In the Family" – 5:24

Have Spacesuit Will Travel
 "Un Chien d'espace" – 13:40
 "Have Spacesuit, Will Travel" – 13:51
 "Ohm's Concerto for Alto and Soprano Saw" – 1:38

Lovelight
 "Sideway Spiral II" – 3:21
 "Like Always" – 3:39
 "Stalemate" – 4:55
 "Starmelt/Lovelight" – 3:30
 "Timothy's Monster" – 4:16
 "Atlantis Swing" - 1:08

Songwriters
"Ohm's Concerto for Alto and Soprano Saw" – O.H. Moe; "Sideway Spiral I", "Like Always", "Back to Source" – Ryan/Sæther; "Walking on the Water", "Pills, Powders + Passion Plays", "In the Family", "Stalemate" – Sæther; "Heartattack Mac", "Sideway Spiral II", "Starmelt/Lovelight", "Timothy's Monster", "Un Chien D'espace" – Gebhardt/Ryan/Sæther; "Have Spacesuit, Will Travel" – Gebhardt/Ryan/Sæther/Henlein
"Atlantis Swing" – unknown, but possibly Gebhardt/Ryan/Sæther/Fagervik

Performers
Bent Sæther — vocals, bass, electric & acoustic guitars, piano, mellotron, rhodes, moog taurus, percussion; drum solo on "Sideway Spiral I"
Hans Magnus Ryan — vocals, electric & acoustic guitars, bass, double bass, piano, organ, vibraphone, moog taurus, percussion; drums on "Atlantic Swing"
Håkon Gebhardt — drums, percussion, banjo, piano, vocals
Ole Henrik Moe — alto + soprano saw, piano, violin
Deathprod — oscillators, echoplex, reverators, ring modulators
Morten Fagervik — guitar on "Atlantis Swing"

Motorpsycho albums
1997 albums